Jule Styne (born Julius Kerwin Stein; December 31, 1905 – September 20, 1994) was an English-American songwriter and composer best known for a series of Broadway musicals, including several famous frequently-revived shows that also became successful films: Gypsy, Gentlemen Prefer Blondes, and Funny Girl.

Early life
Styne was born to a Jewish family in London, England. His parents, Anna Kertman and Isadore Stein, were emigrants from Ukraine, the Russian Empire, and ran a small grocery. Even before his family left Britain, he did impressions on the stage of well-known singers, including Harry Lauder, who saw him perform and advised him to take up the piano. At the age of eight, he moved with his family to Chicago, where he began taking piano lessons. He proved to be a prodigy and performed with the Chicago, St. Louis, and Detroit Symphonies before he was ten years old.

Career
Before Styne attended Chicago Musical College, he had already attracted the attention of another teenager, Mike Todd, later a successful film producer, who commissioned him to write a song for a musical act that he was creating. It was the first of over 1,500 published songs Styne composed in his career. His first hit, "Sunday", was written in 1926.

In 1929, Styne was playing with the Ben Pollack band.

Styne was a vocal coach for 20th Century Fox until Darryl F. Zanuck fired him because vocal coaching was "a luxury, and we're cutting out those luxuries." Zanuck told him he should write songs because "that's forever." Styne established his own dance band, which got him noticed in Hollywood, where he was championed by Frank Sinatra and began a collaboration with lyricist Sammy Cahn. He and Cahn wrote many songs for the movies, including "It's Been a Long, Long Time" (No. 1 for three weeks for Harry James and His Orchestra in 1945), "Five Minutes More", and the Oscar-winning title song for Three Coins in the Fountain (1954). Ten of his songs were Oscar-nominated, many of them written with Cahn, including "I've Heard That Song Before" (No. 1 for 13 weeks for Harry James and His Orchestra in 1943), "I'll Walk Alone", "It's Magic" (a No. 2 hit for Doris Day in 1948), and "I Fall In Love Too Easily". He collaborated with Leo Robin on the score for the 1955 musical film My Sister Eileen.

In 1947, Styne wrote his first score for a Broadway musical, High Button Shoes, with Cahn, and over the next several decades wrote the scores for many Broadway shows, most notably Gentlemen Prefer Blondes, Peter Pan (additional music), Bells Are Ringing, Gypsy, Do Re Mi, Funny Girl, Lorelei, Sugar (with a story based on the movie Some Like It Hot, but all new music), and the Tony-winning Hallelujah, Baby!.

Styne wrote original music for the short-lived themed amusement park Freedomland U.S.A. that opened on June 19, 1960.

His collaborators included Sammy Cahn, Leo Robin, Betty Comden and Adolph Green, Stephen Sondheim, Bob Hilliard, and Bob Merrill.  
 
He wrote career-altering Broadway scores for a wide variety of major stars, including Phil Silvers, Carol Channing, Mary Martin, Judy Holliday, Ethel Merman, and an up-and-coming Barbra Streisand.

He was the subject of This Is Your Life for British television in 1978 when he was surprised by Eamonn Andrews in New York's Time Square.

Styne died of heart failure in New York City at the age of 88. His archiveincluding original hand-written compositions, letters, and production materialsis housed at the Harry Ransom Center.

Awards
Styne was elected to the Songwriters Hall of Fame in 1972 and the American Theatre Hall of Fame in 1981, and he was a recipient of a Drama Desk Special Award and the Kennedy Center Honors in 1990. Additionally, Styne won the 1955 Oscar for Best Music, Original Song for "Three Coins in the Fountain", and "Hallelujah, Baby!" won the 1968 Tony Award for Best Original Score.

Songs
A selection of the many songs that Styne wrote:
 "The Christmas Waltz"
 "Conchita Marquita Lolita Pepita Rosita Juanita Lopez"
 "Don't Rain on My Parade" (from Funny Girl)
 "Diamonds Are a Girl's Best Friend" (from Gentlemen Prefer Blondes)
 "Everything's Coming Up Roses" (from Gypsy)
 "Every Street's a Boulevard in Old New York" (from Hazel Flagg)
 "Fiddle Dee Dee"
 "Guess I'll Hang My Tears Out to Dry"
 "How Do You Speak to an Angel"
 "I Don't Want to Walk Without You"
 "I Fall in Love Too Easily" (from Anchors Aweigh)
 "I Still Get Jealous" (High Button Shoes)
 "I'll Walk Alone"
 "It's Been a Long, Long Time"
 "It's Magic" (from Romance on the High Seas)
 "It's You or No One"
 "I've Heard That Song Before"
 "Just in Time" (from Bells Are Ringing)
 "Let Me Entertain You" (from Gypsy)
 "Let It Snow! Let It Snow! Let It Snow!"
 "Long Before I Knew You"
 "Make Someone Happy" (from Do Re Mi)
 "Money Burns a Hole in My Pocket" (from Living It Up)
 "Neverland"
 "Papa, Wont You Dance with Me?"
 "The Party's Over" (from Bells Are Ringing)
 "People" (from Funny Girl)
 "Pico and Sepulveda"
 "Saturday Night (Is the Loneliest Night of the Week)" sung by Frank Sinatra
 "Small World", from Gypsy, which became a moderate hit when sung by Johnny Mathis in 1959
 "Sunday" with Ned Miller
 "The Things We Did Last Summer"
 "Time After Time" (from It Happened in Brooklyn)
 "Three Coins in the Fountain", Oscar-winning song from the film of the same name
 "Together (Wherever We Go)" (from Gypsy)
 "Winter Was Warm" (from Mr. Magoo's Christmas Carol)

Credits
 Ice Capades of 1943 (1942) – Styne contributed one song
 Glad to See You! (1944) – closed in Philadelphia, Pennsylvania, during tryout
 High Button Shoes (1947)
 Gentlemen Prefer Blondes (1949)
 Michael Todd's Peep Show (1950) – Styne contributed 2 numbers
 Two on the Aisle (1951)
 Hazel Flagg (1953)
 Peter Pan (1954) (additional music)
 My Sister Eileen (1955)
 Bells Are Ringing (1956)
 Say, Darling (1958)
 A Party with Betty Comden and Adolph Green (1958)
 First Impressions (1959) (produced by)
 Gypsy (1959)
 Do Re Mi (1960)
 Subways Are for Sleeping (1961)
 Mr. Magoo's Christmas Carol (1962)
 Arturo Ui (1963) – Styne contributed incidental music to this Bertolt Brecht play
 Funny Girl (1964)
 Wonderworld (1964) – lyrics by Styne's son, Stanley
 Fade Out – Fade In (1964)
 Something More! (1964) – directed by Styne
 The Dangerous Christmas of Red Riding Hood (1965)
 Hallelujah, Baby! (1967)
 Darling of the Day (1968)
 Look to the Lilies (1970)
 The Night the Animals Talked (1970)
 Prettybelle (1971) – closed in Boston
 Sugar (1972) (revised as Some Like It Hot: The Musical for a 2002-03 national USA tour starring Tony Curtis as Osgood Fielding, Jr.)
 Lorelei (1974) – essentially a sequel/revival of Gentlemen Prefer Blondes
 Hellzapoppin'! (1976) – closed in Baltimore during pre-Broadway tryout
 Side by Side by Sondheim (1976)
 Bar Mitzvah Boy (1978)
 One Night Stand (1980) – closed during preview period
 Pieces of Eight (1985)
 The Red Shoes (1993)

References

Further reading
 Suskin, Steven (1986). Show Tunes 1905-1985: The Songs, Shows and Careers of Broadway's Major Composers, New York: Dodd, Mead and Company, 1986.
 Suskin, Steven (2009). The Sound of Broadway Music, Oxford: Oxford University Press, 2009.
 Taylor, Theodore. Jule: The Story of Composer Jule Styne, New York: Random House, 1979.

External links
 
 Jule Styne Papers at the Harry Ransom Center, University of Texas at Austin
 
 
 
 Jule Styne at the Kennedy Center

1905 births
1994 deaths
20th-century American Jews
20th-century American musicians
20th-century classical musicians
20th-century English musicians
American people of Ukrainian-Jewish descent
Best Original Song Academy Award-winning songwriters
British emigrants to the United States
British musical theatre composers
British songwriters
Broadway composers and lyricists
English Jews
English people of Ukrainian-Jewish descent
Grammy Award winners
Jewish American classical musicians
Jewish American songwriters
Kennedy Center honorees
Male musical theatre composers
Musicians from London
Tony Award winners